HD 171028 b is a >1.83 MJ exoplanet orbiting very eccentrically around HD 171028. The period is 1.47 years and semi-major axis of 1.29 AU. The Geneva Extrasolar Planet Search team announced the discovery of planet on July 13, 2007.

References 

  web preprint

External links 
 

Exoplanets discovered in 2007
Giant planets
Ophiuchus (constellation)
Exoplanets detected by radial velocity